Blanket Warm is the debut studio album of Lullaby for the Working Class. It was released September 24, 1996 on Bar/None Records.

Track listing
 "Good Morning" - 4:01
 "Honey, Drop the Knife" - 3:16
 "Turpentine" - 3:44
 "Spreading the Evening Sky with Crows" - 3:13
 "Boar's Nest" - 3:52
 "Eskimo Song Duel" - 1:46
 "Three Peas in a Pod" - 4:00
 "Rye" - 3:50
 "Queen of the Long-Legged Insects" - 3:09
 "The Drama of Your Life" - 3:52
 "February North 24th St." - 2:49
 "The Wounded Spider" - 3:45
 "Good Night" - 10:22

Personnel
Lullaby for the Working Class
A.J. Mogis - bass
Anil Seth - cello
Nathan Putens - clarinet 
Clint Schnase, Shane Aspegren - drums
Mike Mogis - guitar, banjo, mandolin, glockenspiel
Andy Strain, Johnathon Hischke - trombone 
Nate Walcott - trumpet
Chris Gordon - violin
Ted Stevens - vocals, guitar, lyrics

Production
Eric Medley - mastering
A.J. Mogis, Mike Mogis - recording, mixing

Artwork
Thomas Irvin - layout
Rob Walters - photography

References

1996 debut albums
Lullaby for the Working Class albums
Bar/None Records albums